Powder Keg or Powderkeg may refer to:

 Powder keg, a keg of gunpowder, or, metaphorically, a politically unstable geographic region

Film and television
 Powder Keg (1998 film) or Cabaret Balkan, a Serbian film
 Powder Keg (2001 film), a short film directed by Alejandro González Iñárritu, in the BMW branded series The Hire
 "The Powder Keg", a chapter of the 1950 film serial Desperadoes of the West
 "Powder Keg" (Murder, She Wrote), a 1986 television episode
 "Powderkeg" (Bearcats!), a 1971 television episode
 "Powder Keg", a 1957 episode of Hawkeye and the Last of the Mohicans

Music
 Powder Keg, an album by Charlie Daniels, 1987
 Powderkeg, an album by the Glasspack, 2002
 "Powder Keg", an instrumental by Wayne Shorter from Wayning Moments, 1961
 "Powder Keg", a song by the Fall from The Light User Syndrome, 1996
 "Powderkeg", a song by 7th Order, 2011

Other uses
 Powder Keg: A Blast into the Wilderness, a roller coaster at Silver Dollar City in Branson, Missouri, US
 Powderkeg (character), a Marvel Comics supervillain
 Powder Keg Festival, a festival in Buffalo, New York, US
 The Powder Keg, a sports rivalry between Tilton School and New Hampton School in New Hampshire, US

See also
 Powder keg of Europe, a term applied to the Balkans in the early 20th century
 Krudttønden (lit. "The Powder Keg"), a café and cultural centre in Copenhagen, Denmark